Johann Pichler (15 December 1912 – 16 February 1995) was a Luftwaffe ace and recipient of the Knight's Cross of the Iron Cross during World War II. The Knight's Cross of the Iron Cross was awarded to recognise extreme battlefield bravery or successful military leadership.  During his career Johann Pichler was credited with between 52 and 75 aerial victories.

Awards and decorations
 Flugzeugführerabzeichen
 Front Flying Clasp of the Luftwaffe in Gold
 Ehrenpokal der Luftwaffe (25 June 1943)
 Iron Cross (1939)
 2nd Class
 1st Class
 German Cross in Gold on 18 March 1943 as Oberfeldwebel in the 7./Jagdgeschwader 77
 Knight's Cross of the Iron Cross on 19 August 1944 as Fahnenjunker-Oberfeldwebel and pilot in the 7./Jagdgeschwader 77

References

Citations

Bibliography

External links
TracesOfWar.com

1912 births
1995 deaths
People from Fürstenfeldbruck (district)
People from the Kingdom of Bavaria
Luftwaffe pilots
German World War II flying aces
Recipients of the Gold German Cross
Recipients of the Knight's Cross of the Iron Cross
Military personnel from Bavaria